The 1957 VFL Grand Final was an Australian rules football game contested between the Melbourne Football Club and Essendon Football Club, held at the Melbourne Cricket Ground on 21 September 1957. It was the 60th annual Grand Final of the Victorian Football League, staged to determine the premiers for the 1957 VFL season. The match, attended by 100,324 spectators, was won by Melbourne by 61 points, marking that club's ninth premiership victory.

This was Melbourne's fourth successive Grand Final appearance and third successive premiership. Ron Barassi starred for the Demons with five goals, four of them in the first half to put the game out of Essendon's reach. Melbourne's coach Norm Smith had previously participated in successive premierships as a player, from 1939 to 1941.

Teams

{|
|valign="top"|

 Umpire - Allan Nash

Statistics

Goalkickers

Attendance
 MCG crowd - 100,324

References
1957 VFL Grand Final statistics
 The Official statistical history of the AFL 2004 
 Ross, J. (ed), 100 Years of Australian Football 1897-1996: The Complete Story of the AFL, All the Big Stories, All the Great Pictures, All the Champions, Every AFL Season Reported, Viking, (Ringwood), 1996.

See also
 1957 VFL season
 1948 VFL Grand Final
 2000 AFL Grand Final

VFL/AFL Grand Finals
Grand
Melbourne Football Club
Essendon Football Club